Raised on Rock is the fifth album by rock band Alex Beyrodt's Voodoo Circle. It was released on 9 February 2018 via AFM Records and it was produced by Alex Beyrodt itself with the collaboration of bass guitarist Mat Sinner. This is the first album with new lead singer Herbie Langhans (Avantasia) instead of David Readman (Pink Cream 69) and the former Italian keyboardist/vocalist Alessandro Del Vecchio co-wrote one track and a bonus for limited and Japanese edition.

The album was preceded by the singles "Running Away from Love" on 15 December 2017 and "Higher Love" on 26 January 2018.

Track listing
All songs are written by Alex Beyrodt, Herbie Langhans and Mat Sinner unless otherwise noted.

Personnel

Voodoo Circle
Herbie Langhans - vocals
Alex Beyrodt - guitar, producing
Mat Sinner - bass guitar, co-producing
Francesco "Cesco" Jovino* - drums

Additional personnel
Corvin Bahn - organ, keyboards
Jacob Hansen - mixing, mastering
Hiko - artwork
Barandash Karandashich - graphics
Alex Kuehr - photos

References

2018 albums
Voodoo Circle albums
AFM Records albums